Wiltshire
King George
King George
King George